Marinospirillum minutulum is a helical, halophilic and Gram-negative bacterium from the genus of Marinospirillum.

References

Oceanospirillales
Bacteria described in 1959